Looking for an Angel may refer to:

"Looking for an Angel", Phil Collins song, performed by Laura Pausini on La mia risposta
"Looking for an Angel", song by Kylie Minogue from the album Aphrodite